The Umbrian regional election of 1975 took place on 15 June 1975.

Events
The Italian Communist Party was by far the largest party, gaining almost twice the votes of Christian Democracy. After the election, Pietro Conti, the incumbent Communist President, continued to govern the Region at the head of a left-wing coalition with the Italian Socialist Party (Popular Democratic Front). In 1976 Conti was replaced by Germano Marri, a Communist too.

Results

Source: Ministry of the Interior

Elections in Umbria
1975 elections in Italy